The 17th Annual Tony Awards took place on April 28, 1963, in the Hotel Americana Imperial Ballroom in New York City. The ceremony was broadcast on local television station WWOR-TV (Channel 9) in New York City. The awards were given to plays and musicals from the 1962/63 season that had their premiere on Broadway. The Masters of Ceremonies were Abe Burrows and Robert Morse.

The ceremony
Presenters: Elizabeth Ashley, Jean-Pierre Aumont, Orson Bean, Vivian Blaine, Diahann Carroll, Dane Clark, Betty Field, Martin Gabel, Anita Gillette, June Havoc, Helen Hayes, Van Heflin, Pat Hingle, Celeste Holm, Nancy Kelly, Sam Levene, Walter Matthau, Helen Menken, Phyllis Newman, Maureen O'Sullivan, Charles Nelson Reilly, William Prince, Rosalind Russell, David Wayne. Music was by Meyer Davis and his Orchestra.

Winners and nominees
Winners are in bold

Sources: InfoPlease, BroadwayWorld

Special award
Bette Davis, honored her as an actress who was created the performance for almost 30 years, honored for her work with the National Repertory Theatre.

Multiple nominations and awards

These productions had multiple nominations:

10 nominations: Little Me and Oliver!    
8 nominations: A Funny Thing Happened on the Way to the Forum  
6 nominations: Who's Afraid of Virginia Woolf?   
5 nominations: Stop the World – I Want to Get Off   
4 nominations: Mother Courage and Her Children and Tchin-Tchin 
3 nominations: Bravo Giovanni, The Lady of the Camellias, The School for Scandal and A Thousand Clowns 
2 nominations: The Beauty Part, Beyond the Fringe, Brigadoon, Mr. President, Never Too Late and Tovarich 

The following productions received multiple awards.

6 wins: A Funny Thing Happened on the Way to the Forum 
5 wins: Who's Afraid of Virginia Woolf? 
3 wins: Oliver!

References

External links
 

Tony Awards ceremonies
1963 in theatre
1963 awards
1963 in New York City
1963 awards in the United States
April 1963 events in the United States